Diego Montoya Mendoza (23 July 1593 – 14 April 1640) was a Roman Catholic prelate who served as Bishop of Trujillo (1637–1640) and Bishop of Popayán (1633–1637).

Biography
Diego Montoya Mendoza was born in Mijancas, Spain on 23 July 1593.
On 5 September 1633, he was appointed during the papacy of Pope Urban VIII as Bishop of Popayán.
On 27 December 1634, he was consecrated bishop by Pedro de Oviedo Falconi, Bishop of Quito. 
On 20 February 1637, he was selected by the King of Spain and confirmed by Pope Urban VIII on 5 Oct 1637.
He served as Bishop of Trujillo until his death on 14 April 1640. 
Two days after his death on 16 July 1640, he was appointed as Bishop of Cuzco by Pope Urban VIII.

References

External links and additional sources
 (for Chronology of Bishops) 
 (for Chronology of Bishops) 
 (for Chronology of Bishops) 
 (for Chronology of Bishops) 
 (for Chronology of Bishops) 
 (for Chronology of Bishops) 

17th-century Roman Catholic bishops in New Granada
Bishops appointed by Pope Urban VIII
1593 births
1640 deaths
17th-century Roman Catholic bishops in Peru
Roman Catholic bishops of Cusco
Roman Catholic bishops of Trujillo
Roman Catholic bishops of Popayán